T&G may refer to:

 Telegram & Gazette, a newspaper in Massachusetts, USA
 Thresher & Glenny, London tailors
 Touch-and-go landing, an aviation maneuver
 T & G Mutual Life Assurance Society, an insurance company in Australia and New Zealand 
 Talented and Gifted (disambiguation)
 Transport and General Workers' Union, a former British trade union
 Tongue and groove, a method for connecting two pieces of wood or similar material
 Toni & Guy, British hairdressing chain

See also
 TNG (disambiguation)
 TAG (disambiguation)
 TG (disambiguation)